An unfinished symphony is a fragment of a symphony, by a particular composer, that musicians and academics consider incomplete or unfinished for various reasons. The archetypal unfinished symphony is Franz Schubert's Symphony No. 8 (sometimes called Schubert's Unfinished Symphony), written in 1822, six years before his death. It features two fully orchestrated movements. While it seems clear from sketches that Schubert set out to create a traditional four-movement symphony, this has been the subject of endless debate. Schubert wrote the symphony for the Graz Musical Society, and gave the manuscript to his friend Anselm Hüttenbrenner, in his capacity as its representative. However, Hüttenbrenner did not show the score to the society at that time, nor did he reveal the existence of the manuscript after Schubert died in 1828, but kept it a secret for another 37 years. In 1865, when he was 76 (three years before his death), Hüttenbrenner finally showed it to the conductor Johann von Herbeck, who conducted the extant two movements on 17 December 1865 in Vienna, adding the last movement of Schubert's third symphony as the finale. Music historians and scholars then toiled to "prove" the composition was complete in its two-movement form, and indeed, in that form it became one of the most popular pieces in the late 19th century classical music repertoire, and remains one of Schubert's most popular compositions.

Other unfinished symphonies

The unfinished symphony may also refer to:

Ludwig van Beethoven's Symphony No. 10, a hypothetical work assembled by Barry Cooper from fragmentary sketches left by Beethoven.
Georges Bizet's Roma Symphony, sometimes described as "unfinished", but this is misleading. After eleven years of tinkering (1860–1871), with a partial performance in 1869, Bizet could still not produce a version that truly satisfied him. However, the latest version of the symphony was published posthumously in 1880, and is a complete work in the sense that all the movements are fully scored.
Alexander Borodin's Symphony No. 3, which only contains two drafted movements, and was later completed for publication by Alexander Glazunov.
Anton Bruckner's Symphony No. 9, which only contains three complete movements and a draft of the fourth movement. There have been a number of completions made of the fourth movement, but most conductors opt to perform and record only the first three.
Anton Bruckner's Symphony in B minor (only few sketches)
Boudewijn Buckinx's symphonies. In the years 1991–1992 this postmodern Belgian composer composed nine unfinished symphonies (which premiered in 1993).
Norbert Burgmüller's Symphony No. 2, which only contains two complete movements. The third movement, a scherzo, was finished and orchestrated by Robert Schumann.
Edward Elgar's Symphony No. 3 in C minor, op. 88 (1932–34), which Elgar left with a mass of sketches for the four movements of this potentially major work, with a few passages fully scored. A highly creative performing version was achieved in 1997 by Anthony Payne.
Charles Gounod's Symphony No. 3 in C major
Johannes Brahms's Symphony No. 5 in G major, he gave up this project and made use of the themes to complete "String Quintet No.2 in G major (op.111)
Charles Ives's Universe Symphony, a composition which Ives worked on periodically between 1911 and 1928.  During the 1980s and 1990s, there were three separate performing versions assembled, including a version by David Gray Porter (1993), Larry Austin (1994), and Johnny Reinhard (1996).
Gustav Mahler's Symphony No. 10, which Mahler left with a continuous draft of this five-movement work, with the first and third movements more or less fully scored. These two movements (Adagio and Purgatorio) were prepared for publication by Franz Schalk and Ernst Krenek in 1924. Various orchestrations and performing editions of the entire symphony have been made since the 1960s, including that of Deryck Cooke (1960–64), subsequently revised with input from Berthold Goldschmidt, Colin Matthews and David Matthews and a sparer, brass-prominent version by Joseph Wheeler.
Carl Nielsen's Symphony in F major (1888), which only contains the completed first movement, which later got the title Symphonic Rhapsody FS 7. It was performed twice, but Nielsen never composed the rest of it. Instead he started composing what would become his first symphony in G minor, which is famous for being the first symphony in history that changes key and ends in C major.
Franz Schubert's Symphony No. 7, which only contains a completed first movement and a single instrument part for the remaining symphony. Completions were made by John Francis Barnett, Felix Weingartner and Brian Newbould, among others.
Franz Schubert's Symphony No. 10, a symphonic sketch from 1828 reconstructed as a three-movement work often referred to as his Tenth or Last symphony. (Scholars believe it is the work meant by a reference to the 'Last Symphony' (Letzte Symphonie) in a contemporary obituary of Schubert.)
Jean Sibelius's Symphony No. 8, which was announced during his life several times, but was probably destroyed by the composer.
Wilhelm Stenhammar's Symphony No. 3, which contains a draft of a first movement (including a seven-page fragment in full score) and sketches of three other movements. The full-score fragment of the first movement was edited with a concert ending by Tommy B. Andersson and first performed in 1991.
Pyotr Ilyich Tchaikovsky's Symphony No. 7, which Tchaikovsky abandoned; he reused the sketches for his third piano concerto and Andante and Finale. Semyon Bogatyrev produced the symphony version, now sometimes called "Symphony No.7".
Eduard Tubin's Symphony No. 11, which contains a partially orchestrated first movement and the opening ten bars of a second movement. The orchestration of the first movement was completed by Kaljo Raid in 1987 and this movement has been performed and recorded several times.
Ernest John Moeran's Symphony No. 2 in E flat major, which Moeran left with advanced sketches for the four movements at the time of his death, in 1950. The manuscript of that work and various others were donated by his widow Peers Coetmore to the Victorian College of the Arts in Melbourne. Conductor Martin Yates has recently realised and completed the Symphony No. 2 from sketches and the recording of the work with Yates conducting the Royal Scottish National Orchestra was released on the Dutton Epoch label (together with the early Overture and also with Martin Yates' own orchestration of Sarnia by John Ireland in October 2011).
Richard Arnell's Symphony No. 7 "Mandela", op. 201. Arnell had left sketches for a Seventh Symphony, dedicated to Nelson Mandela, at the time of his death, in 2009, and it has since been realised and completed by Martin Yates. It was recorded in the summer of 2010 by Yates and the RSNO and was issued by Dutton Epoch.
Alfred Schnittke's Symphony No. 9 was written two years before his death in 1998. The reconstruction of the manuscript of a barely readable score was made by a younger generation composer – Alexander Raskatov – hired by Irina Schnittke, the composer's widow. Raskatov not only reconstructed Schnittke's Ninth but also wrote his own composition: Nunc dimittis – In memoriam Alfred Schnittke. The premiere recording of both pieces was conducted by Dennis Russell Davies.
Richard Wagner's Symphony in E major was begun in 1834, being an orchestration of his Grand Piano Sonata in A major. He sketched out the first movement and part of the second before abandoning the work. The manuscript was lost, being found in a second-hand bookshop in Berlin in 1886. His wife Cosima asked Wagner's assistant Felix Mottl to orchestrate the sketches.
Edvard Grieg's Symphony No. 2, subtitled "In Spring", was left as sketches when he died in 1907.
Allan Pettersson's Symphonies No. 1 and 17. No. 1 was begun in 1951, Pettersson wrote a substantial amount of material before he became dissafected with the piece. However, through his life, Pettersson returned to the score several times despite being unable to finish it. Symphony No. 17 was apparently begun in 1979, only leaving a fragment of only 207 bars before he died on 20 June 1980. Both works were completed by Christian Lindberg.
Louis Vierne's Organ Symphony No.7 in C minor was begun briefly before his death on 2 June 1937, leaving unfinished sketches.
Claude Debussy's Symphony in B minor was written between 1880 and 1881 for four-hands piano, he intended to write it in three movements but left two. Debussy sent the manuscript to Nadezhda von Meck, so the score was kept in a Russian archive after her death. It was published posthumously by Muzgiz in 1933. The work was never orchestrated by Debussy himself, being arranged for orchestra by Tony Finno.
Arnold Bax's Symphony in F major was composed in 1907 but left it in a piano score, being dissatisfied with it. It was much later orchestrated by British conductor Martin Yates.
Mieczysław Weinberg's Symphony No. 22 was finished in a piano score when he died on 26 February 1996, unable to orchestrate it. Weinberg's wife Olya suggested to Kirill Umansky that he might orchestrate the score. Immersing himself in Weinberg's symphonic music, Umansky completed the orchestration and the first performance was given by the Belgorod State Philharmonic Orchestra in 2003.
Mikhail Glinka's Symphonies. Glinka began and left unfinished a single movement two symphonies: A Symphony in B flat major, and the more known Symphony in D minor, subtitled "On Two Russian themes". The first was completed by Petr Klimov, the second by Vissarion Shebalin.

See also
Curse of the ninth
List of symphonies with names

References